The 41st National Film Awards, presented by Directorate of Film Festivals, the organisation set up by Ministry of Information and Broadcasting, India to felicitate the best of Indian Cinema released in the year 1993. Ceremony took place in 1994.

With 41st National Film Awards, a new award for Best Non-Feature Film Music Direction was introduced for non-feature films section awarded with Rajat Kamal (Silver Lotus).

Awards 

Awards were divided into feature films, non-feature films and books written on Indian cinema.

Lifetime Achievement Award

Feature films 

Feature films were awarded at All India as well as regional level. For 41st National Film Awards, a Bengali film, Charachar won the National Film Award for Best Feature Film whereas an Urdu film, Muhafiz along with a Malayalam film, Ponthan Mada won the maximum number of awards (4). Following were the awards given in each category:

Juries 

A committee headed by T. Subbarami Reddy was appointed to evaluate the feature films awards. Following were the jury members:

 Jury Members
 T. Subbarami Reddy (Chairperson)Gautam BoraMadhabi MukherjeeSalil ChowdhuryBidhu Bhusan DasHariharanSitakant MisraNachiket PatwardhanJ. L. RalhanB. Narsing RaoR. C. SakthiValampuri SomanathanVijaya

All India Award 

Following were the awards given:

Golden Lotus Award 

Official Name: Swarna Kamal

All the awardees are awarded with 'Golden Lotus Award (Swarna Kamal)', a certificate and cash prize.

Silver Lotus Award 

Official Name: Rajat Kamal

All the awardees are awarded with 'Silver Lotus Award (Rajat Kamal)', a certificate and cash prize.

Regional Awards 

The award is given to best film in the regional languages in India.

Best Feature Film in Each of the Language Other Than Those Specified in the Schedule VIII of the Constitution

Non-Feature Films 

Short Films made in any Indian language and certified by the Central Board of Film Certification as a documentary/newsreel/fiction are eligible for non-feature film section.

Juries 

A committee headed by Bikram Singh was appointed to evaluate the non-feature films awards. Following were the jury members:

 Jury Members
 Bikram Singh (Chairperson)GulzarParesh MehtaK. R. MohananTanusree Shankar

Golden Lotus Award 

Official Name: Swarna Kamal

All the awardees are awarded with 'Golden Lotus Award (Swarna Kamal)', a certificate and cash prize.

Silver Lotus Award 

Official Name: Rajat Kamal

All the awardees are awarded with 'Silver Lotus Award (Rajat Kamal)' and cash prize.

Best Writing on Cinema 

The awards aim at encouraging study and appreciation of cinema as an art form and dissemination of information and critical appreciation of this art-form through publication of books, articles, reviews etc.

Juries 

A committee headed by Khalid Mohamed was appointed to evaluate the writing on Indian cinema. Following were the jury members:

 Jury Members
 Khalid Mohamed (Chairperson)Udaya Tara NayarUma Vasudev

Golden Lotus Award 
Official Name: Swarna Kamal

All the awardees are awarded with 'Golden Lotus Award (Swarna Kamal)' and cash prize.

Awards not given 

Following were the awards not given as no film was found to be suitable for the award:

 Best Non-Feature Film Direction
 Best Scientific Film
 Best Historical Reconstruction / Compilation Film

References

External links 
 National Film Awards Archives
 Official Page for Directorate of Film Festivals, India

National Film Awards (India) ceremonies
1994 Indian film awards